The 1923 Auckland City mayoral election was part of the New Zealand local elections held that same year. In 1923, elections were held for the Mayor of Auckland plus other local government positions including twenty-one city councillors. The polling was conducted using the standard first-past-the-post electoral method.

Incumbent mayor James Gunson was again declared re-elected unopposed, with no other candidates emerging.

Councillor results

References

Mayoral elections in Auckland
1923 elections in New Zealand
Politics of the Auckland Region
1920s in Auckland